Mikel Brahilika (born 5 August 1999) is an Albanian footballer who plays as a defender for Turbina Cërrik in the Kategoria e Parë.

Career

Luftëtari
In January 2020, Brahilika left Iliria, joining Albanian Superliga club Luftëtari. He made his league debut for the club on 8 March 2020, coming on as a 53rd-minute substitute for Amer Duka in a 1-1 draw with Bylis.

References

External links
Mikel Brahilika at Sofa Score

1999 births
Living people
FC Kamza players
KS Iliria players
Luftëtari Gjirokastër players
Kategoria Superiore players
Kategoria e Parë players
Albanian footballers
Association football defenders